The 2008 season was Malmö FF's 97th in existence, their 73rd season in Allsvenskan and their 8th consecutive season in the league. They competed in Allsvenskan where they finished in 6th position and Svenska Cupen where they were knocked out in the fourth round. The season was Roland Nilssons first season as Malmö FF manager and the last season for the club at Malmö Stadion before moving to Swedbank Stadion for the 2009 season. To celebrate the club's 51-year stay at the stadium, an alternative home kit was used for the first and last match of the league season. The last league match at Malmö Stadion was played against GIF Sundsvall on 9 November and won 6–0 by Malmö FF.

Players

Squad

(on loan from Brøndby IF)

Disciplinary record

Club

Coaching staff

Other information

Competitions

Overall

Allsvenskan

League table

Results summary

Results by round

Matches
Kickoff times are in CEST.

Svenska Cupen

Kickoff times are in CEST.

Non competitive

Pre-season

Mid-season

References 
 

Malmö FF seasons
Malmo FF